Pennsylvania State Senate District 47 includes parts of Beaver County, Butler County, and Lawrence County. It is currently represented by Republican Elder Vogel.

District profile
The district includes the following areas:

Beaver County:

Butler County:

Lawrence County:

Senators

References

Pennsylvania Senate districts
Government of Beaver County, Pennsylvania
Government of Butler County, Pennsylvania
Government of Lawrence County, Pennsylvania